Salvage is a 2006 horror film by the Crook Brothers, Jeffrey Crook and Joshua Crook. It was an official selection of the 2006 Sundance Festival. According to the directors' commentary, the film was shot for around $200,000. It stars Lauren Currie Lewis as Claire Parker, Cody Darbe as her boyfriend Jimmy, and Chris Ferry as Duke Desmond.

Plot
Claire is ending her night shift at a convenience store. She expects her boyfriend will be arriving to drive her home, but instead someone else, who identifies himself as Duke, is driving her boyfriend's truck. After an unsettling ride home during which Duke makes increasingly overt sexual comments about her, Claire closes herself into the safety of her house.

Duke appears at her door, however, claiming she has dropped an earring. Claire refuses to let him in, and he drops the earring on her front porch and apparently leaves. Claire spends several moments crouched in the doorway retrieving the earring, but upon retrieving it and pulling the door closed, finds her back door has swung open. Duke has entered the house from the rear. He brutally murders her.

Claire awakens at the convenience store again, and all seems well. She decides that she has had a nightmare. As her shift ends, her boyfriend arrives, and she goes home and to school. However, unsettling hints begin to appear. The sequence of events once again leads to a moment where Claire is being murdered, and she again awakens in the convenience store.

As each sequence leads towards her death, she hears from time to time people who she trusts talking just out of earshot about how she is "catching on". Finally, she comprehends the clues: she realizes that not only has Duke been killed by the local police, but also that she herself is missing and presumed dead, as is her boyfriend Jimmy.

In the end, it is revealed that Duke Desmond's soul has been occupying Claire's physical body the entire time and he is in Hell reliving the brutal murder of Claire over and over again as eternal punishment. Just before the end credits, Claire again awakens in the convenience store.

Cast

Music
Composer Evan Wilson provided the original score for the movie. Additional music is provided by Devola, a group from the Ohio area (themselves named after a geographic location) where the film was shot.

Production
According to the directors' commentary the film was shot entirely with digital video, accounting for the greatly reduced budget of the film. Additionally the credits reveal that the cast served many "crew" roles, with Lauren Lewis responsible for hair and makeup. There has been no apparent theatrical release of the film, but it is available in DVD release.

Home media
Released on DVD as Gruesome in Australia and in the UK.

Reception
On review aggregator Rotten Tomatoes, the film has an approval rating of 38% based on 8 reviews, with an average rating of 4.6/10.

See also
 Happy Death Day 2U
 Happy Death Day
 List of films featuring time loops

References

External links
 
 

2006 films
2006 horror films
American independent films
American slasher films
Films set in Ohio
Films shot in West Virginia
Supernatural slasher films
Time loop films
2000s English-language films
2000s American films